Macklowe is a surname. Notable people with the surname include:

Harry B. Macklowe (born 1937), American businessman
Julie Macklowe, American investor